Big Bone may refer to:

Big Bone, Kentucky, an unincorporated community
Big Bone Cave, a cave in Tennessee
Big Bone (rapper)
Big Bone (Lil.tyy6)